Dial a Prayer is a 2015 American comedy-drama film written and directed by Maggie Kiley starring Brittany Snow, Glenne Headly and William H. Macy.

Plot
A troubled young woman working at a prayer call center makes a difference in other people's lives, forcing her to reconcile with her troubled past with the faith she brings out in others.

Cast
Brittany Snow as Cora
William H. Macy as Bill
Tom Lipinski as Chase
Glenne Headly as Mary
Kate Flannery as Siobhan
Stephanie Koenig as Jenn
Rhonda Freya English as Georgia
Nicole Forester as Marlene

Reception
The film has a 71% rating on Rotten Tomatoes.  Tracy Moore of Common Sense Media gave the film three stars out of five.

References

External links
 
 

2015 films
American comedy-drama films
Vertical Entertainment films
2015 comedy-drama films
2010s English-language films
2010s American films